Brahmapuri may refer to:
Brahmapuri, Bara, Nepal
Brahmapuri, Janakpur, Nepal
Brahmapuri, Rautahat, Nepal
Brahmapuri, Jodhpur, Rajasthan, India
Bramhapuri, Chandrapur, Maharashtra, India
Brahmapuri (Vidhan Sabha constituency), Maharashtra